Discocerina obscurella is a species of shore flies in the family Ephydridae.

Distribution
Canada, United States, Neotropical, Europe.

References

Ephydridae
Insects described in 1813
Diptera of Europe
Diptera of North America
Diptera of South America
Taxa named by Carl Fredrik Fallén